{{Taxobox
| name = 
| image = 
| image_width = 
| image_caption = 
| regnum = Animalia
| phylum = Mollusca
| classis = Gastropoda
| unranked_superfamilia = clade Heterobranchia
clade Euthyneura
clade Nudipleura
clade Nudibranchia
clade Euctenidiacea
clade Doridacea
| superfamilia = Onchidoridoidea
| familia = Goniodorididae
| genus = Okenia
| species = O. hiroi
| binomial = Okenia hiroi| binomial_authority = (Baba, 1938)
| synonyms = Hopkinsia hiroi Baba, 1938
}}Okenia hiroi is a species of sea slug, specifically a dorid nudibranch, a marine gastropod mollusc in the family Goniodorididae.

Distribution
This species was described from the Kii peninsula, Japan. It has also been found in Korea and Hong Kong.

Description
This Okenia has a broad flattened body and about nine elongate lateral papillae on each side of the mantle. These papillae are irregularly arranged and crowded and there are additional papillae arising from the back. The colour is bright pink with the papillae tipped with white or almost entirely white. It is similar in shape, colour and diet to Okenia rosacea from the Pacific coast of America.

Ecology
The diet of this species is the bryozoan Integripelta acanthus''.

References

Goniodorididae
Gastropods described in 1938